Ørjan Hartveit (born 21 April 1982 in Odda) is a Norwegian classical singer (baritone).

External links
 Official website 
 MIC - Music Information Centre Norway

1982 births
Living people
Norwegian operatic baritones
Musicians from Odda
21st-century Norwegian male opera singers